Strathcona-Sherwood Park is a provincial electoral district in Alberta, Canada. The district was created in the 2010 boundary redistribution and is mandated to return a single member to the Legislative Assembly of Alberta using the first past the post voting system.

History
The electoral district was created in the 2010 Alberta boundary re-distribution. It was created from the old Strathcona electoral district which had a portion of land split off north of Alberta Highway 16 to Fort Saskatchewan-Vegreville.

Boundary history

Electoral history

The electoral district was created in 2010. The current incumbent is Nate Glubish  
who was first elected as MLA in 2019.

Legislature results

2012 general election

2015 general election

2019 general election

References

External links
Elections Alberta

Alberta provincial electoral districts
Sherwood Park